is a railway station on the Kashii Line operated by JR Kyushu in Higashi-ku, Fukuoka Prefecture, Japan.

Lines

Station layout 
The station, which is unstaffed, consists of a side platform serving a single track. A station building, no more than a narrow shed on the pavement, houses a small waiting area and automatic ticket vending machines. Access to the platform is by a short flight of steps after the automatic ticket gates. A designated parking area for bikes is provided outside the station.

Adjacent stations

History
The station was opened by JR Kyushu on 13 March 1988 as an additional station on the existing track of the Kashii Line.

On 14 March 2015, the station became a remotely managed "Smart Support Station". Under this scheme, although the station became unstaffed, passengers using the automatic ticket vending machines or ticket gates could receive assistance via intercom from staff at a central support centre.

Passenger statistics
In fiscal 2016, the station was used by an average of 973 passengers daily (boarding passengers only), and it ranked 169th among the busiest stations of JR Kyushu.

Surrounding area
Kashii-gū

References

External links
Kashii-Jingū (JR Kyushu)

Railway stations in Fukuoka Prefecture
Railway stations in Japan opened in 1988